Sven Regener (born 1 January 1961) is a German musician and writer living in Berlin. In 1982 he recorded his first LP with the band Zatopek and in 1984 he joined Neue Liebe.  In 1985 he founded the Berlin band Element of Crime together with Jakob Friderichs. He writes almost all their lyrics as well as playing trumpet.

In 2001 he published his first novel, Berlin Blues (original title Herr Lehmann), which achieved sales of around one million copies.  The book takes place in autumn 1989 in Berlin. In 2004, Regener was awarded the Deutscher Filmpreis for the screenplay to the film of the same name (best screenplay that has been turned into a film).

His second novel, Neue Vahr Süd, was released in 2004 and follows the life of Frank Lehmann while serving in the Bundeswehr in 1980 in Bremen. In 2008 this was followed by a third novel, Der kleine Bruder (The Little Brother) which dealt with the time between 1980 and 1989.

Bands
Zatopek
Toten Piloten
Neue Liebe
Element of Crime

Works
Herr Lehmann (2001), English translation: Berlin Blues (2003)
Neue Vahr Süd (2004)
Angulus Durus (2006), with Germar Grimsen
Der kleine Bruder (2008)
Magical Mystery (2013)
Wiener Straße (2017)
Glitterschnitter (2021)

References

 https://web.archive.org/web/20070928021524/http://www.randomhouse.ca/author/results.pperl?authorid=48827

1961 births
Living people
Musicians from Bremen
Communist League of West Germany politicians
German male writers